Several special routes of U.S. Route 41 exist, including three in Wisconsin. In order from south to north they are as follows.

Existing

Fort Myers business loop

U.S. Route 41 Business is a former segment of U.S. Route 41 in Downtown Fort Myers and North Fort Myers, Florida.  North of State Road 80, it carries the hidden designation State Road 739.

The road begins at the interchange of US 41 and SR State Road 80-82-867, historically known as the Five Points Interchange. The road briefly overlaps SR 80 along Main and Monroe Streets, where it becomes discontinuous (it once continued east along with SR 80 though downtown along the then-one-way First Street and Second Street but those streets were turned over to city control in 2006).

Business US 41 resumes along SR 739 at SR 80, where it runs along Park Avenue (northbound) and Fowler Street (southbound) until they reach the Edison Bridge where the two streets merge. After crossing over the Caloosahatchee River BUS 41 enters North Fort Myers where it briefly becomes a six-lane undivided highway only for the divider to return north of Cabanna Avenue.   The road heads north, intersecting with State Road 78.  Between State Road 78 and Powell Drive, the road becomes a four-lane divided highway for the remainder of the route. The road finally ends at a former wye at US 41.

Venice business loop

U.S. Route 41 Business is a former segment of U.S. Route 41 and an existing segment of the Tamiami Trail in Venice, Florida that begins near Shamrock Boulevard in Venice Gardens and terminates at Venetia Bay Boulevard in the Eastgate section of Venice. The existing US 41 in Venice runs along the Venice Bypass (hidden SR 45A).

Major intersections

Bradenton business loop

U.S. Route 41 Business is an alternate route and former segment of U.S. Route 41 in Bradenton, Florida that begins at State Road 684 (Cortez Boulevard West) where it runs along 14th Street until it makes a sharp right turn onto 8th Avenue West and then makes another sharp left onto 9th Street West before intersecting with State Road 64 on eastbound 6th Avenue West and westbound Manatee Avenue West. The road continues north as it passes by South Florida Museum and Bradenton Riverwalk before crossing the Green Bridge and moving onto 8th Avenue W in Palmetto where it intersects 10th Street West, which leads to State Road 43 where the northern concurrency of U.S. Route 41 and U.S. Route 301. As 8th Avenue West passes by 21st Street West, it becomes Valencia Drive and curves to the northeast before terminating at an interchange with US 41 just south of the interchange between US 41 and US 19 in Memphis.

Major intersections

Tampa business loop

U.S. Route 41 Business is an alternate route to U.S. Route 41 in Tampa, Florida that begins on the Nebraska Avenue-Florida Avenue apex in Lutz and continues south on Florida Avenue. Just south of Hillsborough Avenue (U.S. Route 92), Florida Avenue becomes a one-way street and the south-bound portion splits off into Tampa Street until it reaches its southern terminus in Downtown Tampa at US 41 and State Road 676.

U.S. Route 541 was created in 1931 as a western alternate to US 41 between Palmetto and Tampa; US 41 then followed the present US 301 between those points. In 1938, US 41 was moved from Tampa north to Lutz, and the old route became an extension of US 541. US 541 was eliminated in 1951; the route north from Tampa became US 41 Business, while south from Tampa it became US 41, with old US 41 becoming an extension of US 301.

Major intersections

Valdosta business loop

U.S. Route 41 Business (US 41 Bus.) is a  business route of US 41 that travels through the city of Valdosta, Georgia, along with State Route 7 Business (SR 7 Bus.). It utilizes the former path of US 41 and SR 7 through the city, while US 41/SR 7 has been rerouted to Inner Perimeter Road around the eastern edges of the city. The entire length of US 41 Bus. is part of the National Highway System, a system of routes determined to be the most important for the nation's economy, mobility, and defense.

Major intersections

Macon business loop

U.S. Route 41 Business (US 41 Bus.) begins at the northern terminus of the US 41/US 129 overlap, where it shares a concurrency with Georgia State Route 49 (SR 49). Along the way, US 80/SR 22 joins the concurrency. When US 80/US 129 intersects Walnut Street, US 41 Bus./SR 49 turns left and travels concurrent with SR 22 until the intersection with Second Street, where that route turns north. US 41 Bus. turns south at Spring Street, where SR 49 turns north and it is joined by another concurrency with SR 19. US 41 Bus./SR 19 travels south until turning west at Georgia Avenue until splitting into a one-way pair at the intersection with College Street. From that point, northbound US 41 Bus./SR 49 continues west along Georgia Avenue until it reaches Hardeman Avenue, while southbound US 41 Bus./SR 49 travels east along Forsyth Road then turns north along College Street. After a split-diamond interchange with Interstate 75 (I-75; exit 149) and SR 540 where the northbound routes go over the Joe A. Witherington Bridge while the southbound routes go over the Raymond Berry Oakley III Bridge, the one-way pair ends as Hardeman Avenue and Forsyth Street converge and becomes Vineville Avenue. US 41 Bus. terminates at US 41 and SR 247, while SR 19 continues along Vineville Avenue, joined by US 41 until it terminates in Forsyth. The portion of US 41 Bus. from the northern end of the US 80 and US 129/SR 11 concurrencies to the northern terminus, is part of the National Highway System, a system of routes determined to be the most important for the nation's economy, mobility, and defense.

Griffin business loop

U.S. Route 41 Business (US 41 Bus.) in Griffin, Georgia is completely concurrent with US 19 Bus. It begins at the intersection of US 19/SR 3 and US 41/SR 7 with SR 155, and follows SR 155 north around Griffin-Spalding County Airport. Then it turns west at SR 16 until it curves onto SR 92 until finally ending at a wye interchange with US 19/US 41/SR 3. All of US 41 Bus. from the southern end of the SR 16 concurrency to the northern terminus is part of the National Highway System, a system of routes determined to be the most important for the nation's economy, mobility, and defense.

Ringgold truck route

U.S. Route 41 Truck is a short truck detour around a low railroad bridge in Ringgold, Georgia, which is also overlapped by U.S. Route 76 Truck, as well as Georgia State Route 151 and Georgia Route 151 Spur.

Monteagle, TN-Hopkinsville, KY alternate route

U.S. Route 41 Alternate (signed U.S. Route 41A in Tennessee), as of 2005, has a northern terminus in Hopkinsville, Kentucky, 10 miles (16 km) north of the Tennessee line. It serves the city of Clarksville, Tennessee on its way to Nashville, where it briefly runs concurrently with US 41. It then separates again to serve Shelbyville, Winchester, and Tullahoma before rejoining the main route atop Monteagle Mountain. US 41A runs west of US 41 for its entire length, aside from one mile in downtown Nashville, where they are concurrent.

Clarksville alternate route bypass

U.S. Route 41A Bypass (US 41A Byp.) is a bypass of the city of Clarksville, Tennessee, on its south side. It first splits off from the US 41A mainline at 2nd Street and Kraft, following Riverside Drive south, running concurrently with SR 13 and SR 12, along the Cumberland River to an intersection with SR 48 (College Street). It becomes concurrent with SR 48 and they travel south and leave town to an intersection with Cumberland Drive, where SR 13 and SR 48 split off to continue southward. The bypass then curves to the east, still following the river, and enters some neighborhoods and comes to an intersection with Ashland City Road, where SR 12 splits off and goes toward Ashland City. US 41A Byp. then continues east and comes to an end at an intersection with US 41A (Madison Street) and SR 76 (M.L.K. Jr. Parkway). Most of the road is a two-lane highway, occasionally widening to three lanes to accommodate truck traffic on hills.

Hopkinsville truck route

U.S. Route 41 Truck (US 41 Truck) is a  truck route designed for thru traffic, mainly trucks, through Hopkinsville, Kentucky. It follows Interstate 169 from exit 7 to exit 12, and Kentucky Route 1682 west from the interchange to U.S. 41 north of Hopkinsville.

Major intersections

Madisonville-Henderson alternate route

Known and referred to locally as "US 41A" but signed as "Alternate US 41," this highway follows what was the original route of US 41 between the cities of Madisonville and Henderson, Kentucky. It travels largely from east to west from its southern terminus at US 41 on Madisonville's north side until reaching Kentucky Route 814 (KY 814) east of Providence. From that point, the highway begins its turn toward the north, passing mostly through rural areas but also serving the small communities of Dixon and Poole.
Major highways intersecting the route include:
 KY 120, which travels from Marion to Slaughters
 KY 132, which travels from KY 120 through Clay and Dixon to Sebree
 KY 56, which begins at the Ohio River near Old Shawneetown, Illinois and connects the Kentucky communities of Morganfield, Sebree, Beech Grove, and Owensboro
 KY 425, which serves as a southern bypass of Henderson
 and US 60, which US 41A joins on the south side of Henderson for its final .
US 41A's northern terminus is at "The Cloverleaf," the interchange between US 60 and I-69/US 41 on Henderson's north side. It is also former US 43.

Major intersections

Former

Atlanta business loop

U.S. Route 41 Business (US 41 Bus.) was a business route of US 41 that existed in Clayton and Fulton counties. It partially traveled in Atlanta. At least as early as 1919, SR 3 traveled on essentially the same path as it currently does in the northern part of Clayton County and the southeastern part of Fulton County. By the end of 1926, US 41 had been designated on the entire length of SR 3 in these counties. The segment of the highway from just north-northwest of the Henry–Clayton county line to Marietta had a "completed hard surface". By the end of 1929, US 19 was designated on SR 3 in the two counties to the main part of Atlanta.

In 1953, US 19/US 41/SR 3 was shifted eastward onto the "Expressway" (the precursor of Interstate 75 (I-75)) in the southern part of Atlanta, traveled west on Lakewood Avenue, and then resumed the northern path. The former path became US 19 Bus./US 41 Bus. By the end of 1965, US 19/US 41/SR 3 was shifted onto the former path of US 19 Bus./US 41 Bus. in the Atlanta area.

Atlanta–Marietta alternate route

U.S. Route 41 Alternate (US 41 Alt.) was an alternate route of US 41 that existed from Atlanta to Marietta, Georgia. It traversed portions of Fulton and Cobb counties. At least as early as 1919, SR 3 traveled on essentially the same path as it currently does in these two cities. By the end of 1926, US 41 had been designated on the entire length of SR 3 from Atlanta to Marietta. This entire portion of US 41/SR 3 had a "completed hard surface". By the end of 1929, US 19 was designated on this segment of highway.

Late in 1937, SR 3 was split into two parts between Atlanta and the northwest part of Marietta. By the end of the year, SR 3W was established, traveling northwest with US 41 on Marietta Street and Old Marietta Road. By the end of 1946, SR 3W in Atlanta and Marietta was redesignated as part of the SR 3 mainline. By February 1948, the segment of US 41 on SR 3W in this area was redesignated as US 41 Alt. By April 1949, US 41 Alt. was redesignated as US 41 Byp.

Atlanta–Marietta bypass route

U.S. Route 41 Bypass (US 41 Byp.) was a bypass route of US 41 that existed from Atlanta to Marietta, Georgia. It traversed portions of Fulton and Cobb counties. At least as early as 1919, SR 3 traveled on essentially the same path as it currently does in these two cities. By the end of 1926, US 41 had been designated on the entire length of SR 3 from Atlanta to Marietta. This entire segment of US 41/SR 3 had a "completed hard surface".

Late in 1937, SR 3 was split into two parts between Atlanta and the northwest part of Marietta. By the end of the year, SR 3W was established, traveling northwest with US 41 on Marietta Street and Old Marietta Road, while SR 3E traveled north-northwest on Hemphill Street and Northside Drive. By the end of 1946, SR 3W was redesignated as part of the SR 3 mainline. By February 1948, the segment of US 41 on SR 3W in this area was redesignated as US 41 Alt. By April 1949, US 41 Alt. was redesignated as US 41 Byp. By the middle of 1950, US 41 Byp. was redesignated as part of the US 41 mainline.

Atlanta–Marietta temporary route

U.S. Route 41 Temporary (US 41 Temp.) was a temporary iteration of US 41 that existed from Atlanta to Marietta, Georgia. It traversed portions of Fulton and Cobb counties. At least as early as 1919, SR 3 traveled on essentially the same path as it currently does in these two cities. By the end of 1926, US 41 had been designated on the entire length of SR 3 from Atlanta to Marietta. This entire segment of US 41/SR 3 had a "completed hard surface".

Late in 1937, SR 3 was split into two parts between Atlanta and the northwest part of Marietta. US 41/SR 3 traveled northwest on the original path, while SR 3E traveled on a more easterly path between the two cities. SR 3E's path from SR 120 in the east part of Marietta to US 41/SR 3 in the northwestern part of the city had completed grading, but was not surfaced. The rest of SR 3E was under construction. By the end of the year, SR 3E traveled north-northwest on Hemphill Street and Northside Drive. All of SR 3E in the northern part of Atlanta was hard surfaced. From the north part of the city to the northwest part, the highway had completed grading, but was not surfaced. Later that year, all of SR 3E from Atlanta to northwest of the Fulton–Cobb county line had a completed hard surface.

In 1940, nearly the entire segment of SR 3E in Marietta had a completed hard surface. It was under construction from northwest of the Fulton–Cobb county line to the eastern part of Marietta. By the end of the next year, the entire length of SR 3E had a completed hard surface. By February 1948, SR 3E was moved off of Hemphill Avenue. It, along with US 41 Temp., followed US 19 on Spring Street, then traveled west on 14th Street and resumed the Northside Drive path. By April 1949, US 41 Temp./SR 3E's southbound lanes traveled on Hemphill Avenue. By the middle of 1950, US 41 Temp./SR 3E was shifted off of US 19 on Spring Street and 14th Street, and traveled on Hemphill Avenue again. In 1952, US 41 Temp. was redesignated as part of the US 41 mainline, which was shifted off of SR 3W and onto SR 3E.

Chicago toll route

U.S. Route 41 Toll (US 41 Toll) was the original designation for the Tri-State Tollway, which opened in 1958. The toll route entirely followed the Tri-State Tollway and Kingery Expressway from Hammond, Indiana to Wadsworth, Illinois. By 1966, all U.S. toll routes on the Illinois Tollway system, including US 41 Toll, were removed, leaving I-94 and I-294 behind.

Marquette business loop

Business US Highway 41 (Bus.  41) was a state trunkline highway that served as a business loop off US 41 in Michigan through the city of Marquette along Washington and Front streets after the construction of an expressway bypass of downtown. Jurisdiction over the two streets was transferred to the city as part of a route swap that resulted in the decommissioning of the trunkline. It was also previously co-designated Bus. M-28, mirroring the Bus. US 41/Bus. M-28 designations along Bus. M-28 in Ishpeming and Negaunee.

Ishpeming-Negaunee business loop

Business U.S. Highway 41 (Bus. US 41) served Ishpeming and Negaunee is the only one of the three former business loops in Michigan that is still a state-maintained highway, although it is no longer designated Bus. US 41. US 41/M-28 was relocated to bypass the two cities' downtowns in 1937. The highway through downtown Ishpeming and Negaunee was redesignated US 41A/M-28A at the time The Michigan State Highway Department later redesignated it Alt. US 41/Alt. M-28. Eventually it carried the Bus. US 41/Bus. M-28 designation before being designated just Bus. M-28 in 1958.

Baraga business loop

Business U.S. Highway 41 (Bus. US 41) existed in Baraga in the early 1940s. As shown on the maps of the time, US 41 was relocated in Baraga between the publication of the December 1, 1939, and the April 15, 1940, MSHD maps. A business loop followed the old routing through downtown. The last map that shows the loop was published on July 1, 1941. Bus. US 41 is shown under local control on the June 15, 1942, map.

References

41
U.S. Route 41
41
41
41
41
41